Tufail may refer to:

 Tufail ibn Abdullah, family of Abu Bakr
 Tufail Ali Abdul Rehman, Pakistani lawyer
 Tufail Mohammad, Pakistani military officer
 Mian Tufail Mohammad, Pakistani political leader
 Tufail Niazi, Pakistani singer
 Ibn Tufail, Arabic writer

Arabic masculine given names